Kamenka-Sadovka is a rural locality (a selo) in Novokhopyorsk, Novokhopyorsky District, Voronezh Oblast, Russia. The population was 607 as of 2010. There are 11 streets.

Geography 
Kamenka-Sadovka is located 10 km south of Novokhopyorsk (the district's administrative centre) by road. Novokhopyorsk is the nearest rural locality.

References 

Populated places in Novokhopyorsky District